Hiroshima Gakuin Junior and Senior High School, is a private Catholic integrated middle and high school for boys, located in Hiroshima City, in Hiroshima Prefecture, Japan. The school was established by the Jesuits in 1956.

History 
In 1956 the Society of Jesus established this as its third junior-senior high school in Japan. The school follows the broad objectives of Ignatian pedagogy, personal care for each student as an individual, and teamwork. It pursues the objective of training "men for and with others."

Activities 
The mountaineering club has done well in national tournaments and won the inter-high crown in 2007 and 2008. Other national prize-winning clubs at the school are for chemistry, computer programming (2008), and for Shogi. Also, in 2013 four medalists from the school brought home the gold medal from the International Biology Olympiad in Switzerland, where 240 students from 62 countries or regions worldwide participated.

See also

 List of schools in Japan
 List of Jesuit schools

References

External links
 Alumni Association

Jesuit secondary schools in Japan
Schools in Hiroshima Prefecture
Educational institutions established in 1956
1956 establishments in Japan